The 1936–37 season was Newport County's fifth consecutive season in the Third Division South and their 16th in the Football League.

Season review

Results summary

Results by round

Fixtures and results

Third Division South

FA Cup

Third Division South Cup

Welsh Cup

League table

External links
 Newport County 1936-1937 : Results
 Newport County football club match record: 1937
 Welsh Cup 1936/37

References

 Amber in the Blood: A History of Newport County. 

1936-37
English football clubs 1936–37 season
1936–37 in Welsh football